Peter Giles (born 10 June 1958) is a former Australian rules footballer who played with Melbourne in the Victorian Football League (VFL).

Notes

External links 

1958 births
Living people
Australian rules footballers from Victoria (Australia)
Melbourne Football Club players
Sandringham Football Club players